Saleem Jaffar (born November 19, 1962) is a Pakistani cricket coach and former cricketer who played in 14 Tests and 39 One Day Internationals from 1986 to 1992.  Jaffar was born in Karachi, Sindh.He was a right-handed batsman and left-arm left-arm fast bowler who played cricket for Pakistan as well as Karachi and United Bank Limited.

Domestic career
Jaffar took 5 for 11 on his first-class debut in 1983–84, and in 1985–86 finished the season with 80 wickets at a Bowling average of 19.After his test career he played in the British Columbia Mainland Cricket League, in Vancouver, BC, Canada.

International career
He made both Test and ODI debuts against West Indies the season of his international call-up. His tour of England in 1987 was ended by injury. Against England at Karachi in 1987–88 he took five wickets and was selected for the tour of the Caribbean that followed. Against New Zealand at Wellington in 1988–89, he took match figures of 8 for 134, including his only Test five-for.

Test cricket
Saleem Jaffer was included in the squad for the Test match against West Indies at Faisalabad in 1986. In his first Test, Saleem Jaffer scored 9 runs and took 2 wickets for 57 runs. West Indies had earlier scored 240 runs. In the first innings, Saleem Jaffer got his first Test wicket by getting Richie Richardson caught by Asif Mujtaba for 43 runs while in the second innings, Saleem Jaffer completed 2 wickets in the match by dismissing Jeff Dujon Against India in 1987 at Kolkata 148 runs were bowled out for 2, while in Bangalore's Test he could not get a wicket. In Karachi against the England team that visited Pakistan in 1987, he scored 153 runs and targeted 5 players. England scored 294 runs while playing first. It featured David Capel with 98 and John Emburey with 70. Saleem Jaffer had bowled 2 wickets for 74 runs. He got the remaining 3 wickets in the second innings for which he had to give 79 runs. It was the only time in his Test career to take 5 wickets. In the Lahore Test in 1988, he took 3 wickets for 142 runs against Australia. His performance at Wellington against New Zealand in 1989 was remarkable. New Zealand's first innings score was 447 with Martin Crowe 174 and Andrew Jones 86. Saleem Jaffer bowled out 3 for 94 while in the second innings he bowled for 40 and took 5 wickets. He helped the team by sending New Zealand players Andrew Jones 39, Martin Crow 0, Dipak Patel 2, Jeff Crow 23 and John Bracewell 0 to the pavilion. In 2 Tests against New Zealand in Lahore and Faisalabad in 1990, he managed to bowl 4, 4 players. The Faisalabad Test against Sri Lanka in 1992 was his last Test in which he targeted 3 players for 55

18 runs in the 1987 World Cup
Steve Waugh's 18 runs in the last over in the 1987 World Cup semi-final cost Pakistan dearly. His quick 32 runs also went in Australia's favor. The last over was done by Saleem Jaffer in which Pakistan lost the match by the same score. Observers blamed the defeat on Saleem Jaffer, who would have been replaced by another bowler, but it was not difficult to score eight or ten runs in his over, but this over became a stigma for Saleem Jaffer. He termed the treatment of Jaffar as unfortunate. However, it is not true that Steve Waugh will hardly play any match after this match. After the World Cup semi-finals, Saleem Jaffer was part of the national team in ten Tests and fifteen ODIs but his performance was mediocre due to which he could not retain his place in the team. The Faisalabad Test against Sri Lanka in 1992 proved to be his last Test. The reason for the defeat in the World Cup semi-final was not only Saleem Jaffer but also many other reasons, such as Dickie Bird's wrong dismissal of Imran Khan. Dickie Bird, Imran Khan's favorite umpire, went ahead and admitted his mistake and apologized to Imran Khan. In this match, Saleem Yousuf was injured when Abdul Qadir's ball hit his mouth and Miandad had to stand behind the wickets in his place.

Cricket statistics
Saleem Jaffer remained unbeaten six times in 14 innings of 14 matches and scored 42 runs at an average of 5.25. 10 unbeaten runs was his highest individual score while he remained unbeaten 11 times in 13 innings of 39 ODIs and scored 36 runs at an average of 18.00. 10 unbeaten runs was his highest individual score in a single innings while he remained unbeaten 29 times in 76 innings of 76 matches in 81 first-class matches and scored 379 runs at an average of 8.06. His 33 not out was the highest score of any one innings. Saleem Jaffer made 36 Test wickets part of his record by giving 1139 runs. Out of these wickets at an average of 31.63, 5/40 was the best performance of an innings while 8/134 was the best performance of a single match. He took 40 wickets in ODIs. For which he had an average of 34.55. 3/25 was his best performance in a single match. While in first class matches he took 263 wickets for 6697 runs. 7/29 was his best bowling performance of any one innings. As a result, they got an average of 25.46

After cricket
In 2007 he was appointed as a selector for the Pakistan national cricket team.

International record

Test 5 Wicket hauls

International awards

One-Day International Cricket

Man of the Match awards

References

1962 births
Living people
Pakistan Test cricketers
Pakistan One Day International cricketers
Cricketers at the 1987 Cricket World Cup
Pakistani cricketers
Cricketers from Karachi
Karachi Greens cricketers
Karachi Blues cricketers
Karachi Whites cricketers
United Bank Limited cricketers
Karachi cricketers
Pakistani cricket coaches